SWI-Prolog is a free implementation of the programming language Prolog, commonly used for teaching and semantic web applications. It has a rich set of features, libraries for constraint logic programming, multithreading, unit testing, GUI, interfacing to Java, ODBC and others, literate programming, a web server, SGML, RDF, RDFS, developer tools (including an IDE with a GUI debugger and GUI profiler), and extensive documentation.

SWI-Prolog runs on Unix, Windows, Macintosh and Linux platforms.

SWI-Prolog has been under continuous development since 1987. Its main author is Jan Wielemaker.

The name of this group has changed to HCS (Human-Computer Studies).

Web framework 

SWI-Prolog installs with a web framework based on definite clause grammars.

Distributed computing 

SWI-Prolog queries may be distributed over several servers and web pages through the Pengines system.

XPCE 
XPCE is a platform-independent object-oriented GUI toolkit for SWI-Prolog, Lisp and other interactive and dynamically typed languages. Although XPCE was designed to be language-independent, it has gained popularity mostly with Prolog. The development XPCE graphic toolkit started in 1987, together with SWI-Prolog.

It supports buttons, menus, sliders, tabs and other basic GUI widgets. XPCE is available for all platforms supported by SWI-Prolog.

PceEmacs 
PceEmacs is a SWI-Prolog builtin editor. PceEmacs is an Emacs clone implemented in Prolog (and XPCE). It supports proper indentation, syntax highlighting, full syntax checking by calling the SWI-Prolog parser, warning for singleton variables and finding predicate definitions based on the source information from the Prolog database.

Interface between Java and Prolog (JPL) 
JPL is a bidirectional interface between Java and Prolog. It requires both SWI-Prolog and Java SDK. It is installed as a part of SWI-Prolog.

Constraint logic programming libraries (CLP) 

Constraint logic programming functionality came rather late in the lifetime of SWI-Prolog, because it lacked the basic support. This changed early in 2004, when attributed variables were added to the language. The Leuven CHR library was then the first CLP library to be ported to SWI-Prolog. We mention SWI-Prolog's INCLP(R) library (De Koninck et al. 2006), which provides non-linear constraints over the reals and was implemented on top of CHR. Later came a port of Christian Holzbaur's CLP(QR) library and a finite-domain CLP(FD) solver. Finally, a boolean CLP(B) solver was added.

See also

 Prolog
 Comparison of Prolog implementations

References

External links
 

Free compilers and interpreters
Prolog programming language family
Logic programming languages
Constraint programming
Integrated development environments